Edward Greene Malbone (1777 – May 7, 1807) was an American painter, and the most sought-after miniaturist of his day. He was an influence on other artists including Charles Fraser, William Dunlap and John Wesley Jarvis.

Edward Greene Malbone was born at Newport, Rhode Island and began his career in Providence at the age of seventeen, later working in Boston, New York, Philadelphia, Charleston and London. Exacting and unceasing work undermined his constitution and following an attempt to recover his health in Jamaica, he came to Savannah and died there of tuberculosis at the home of his cousin, Robert Mackay, on May 7, 1807. He is buried in Savannah's Colonial Park Cemetery.

References

External links

 Historic New England. Portrait of Mrs. Harrison Gray (Sally Foster) Otis, 1804
 Edward Greene Malbone historical marker

18th-century American painters
18th-century American male artists
American male painters
19th-century American painters
1777 births
1807 deaths
Artists from Newport, Rhode Island
Artists from Boston
American portrait painters
19th-century deaths from tuberculosis
19th-century American male artists
Tuberculosis deaths in Georgia (U.S. state)